Cho Sung-hwan (born 9 April 1982) is South Korean football defender.

His previous clubs are Suwon Samsung Bluewings, Pohang Steelers, Jeonbuk Hyundai Motors in South Korea, Consadole Sapporo in Japan, Saudi side Al-Hilal Qatari side Muaither SC.

Club statistics

National team statistics

References

External links

1982 births
Living people
Association football defenders
South Korean footballers
South Korean expatriate footballers
South Korea international footballers
Suwon Samsung Bluewings players
Pohang Steelers players
Hokkaido Consadole Sapporo players
Jeonbuk Hyundai Motors players
Al Hilal SFC players
Muaither SC players
K League 1 players
J2 League players
Expatriate footballers in Japan
Sportspeople from South Gyeongsang Province
South Korean expatriate sportspeople in Japan
Expatriate footballers in Saudi Arabia
South Korean expatriate sportspeople in Saudi Arabia
Expatriate footballers in Qatar
South Korean expatriate sportspeople in Qatar
Asian Games medalists in football
Footballers at the 2002 Asian Games
Saudi Professional League players
Qatar Stars League players
Asian Games bronze medalists for South Korea
Medalists at the 2002 Asian Games
People from Haman County
Expatriate footballers in Thailand